Brian Marshall Allard (born January 3, 1958) is a former Major League Baseball pitcher who played for the Texas Rangers (-) and Seattle Mariners. His fastball was 90-95 mph. He also threw a curveball, slider, and changeup. He lives in Washington.

Professional career

Texas Rangers
Allard was selected by Texas Rangers in fourth round, 84th overall, of 1976 Major League Baseball Draft.

He made his debut with the Rangers on August 8,  against the Detroit Tigers at the age of 21. Allard went two innings, giving up two earned runs on two hits in that game. He finished the '79 season going 1–3 in seven games, four for starts, with a 4.32 ERA.

In  Allard went 0-1 for the Rangers with a 5.65 ERA in five games, two for starts.

Seattle Mariners
On December 12, Allard was traded by the Rangers along with Steve Finch, Rick Auerbach, Ken Clay, Jerry Don Gleaton and Richie Zisk to the Seattle Mariners for Larry Cox, Rick Honeycutt, Willie Horton, Mario Mendoza and Leon Roberts.

In  Allard started seven games for the Mariners, including a start against the Cleveland Indians' Len Barker. Barker had thrown a perfect game in his previous start. Allard out dueled Barker, combining with relief pitcher Shawn Rawley to pitch a three-hit game.

Allard went on to finish the '81 season with a 3–2 record with a 3.75 ERA in seven games, all for starts. This would be his last season at the Major League level.

References

External links

Retrosheet

1958 births
Living people
Asheville Tourists players
Baseball players from Illinois
Charleston Charlies players
Gulf Coast Rangers players
Leones del Caracas players
American expatriate baseball players in Venezuela
Major League Baseball pitchers
People from Spring Valley, Illinois
Salt Lake City Gulls players
Seattle Mariners players
Spokane Indians players
Texas Rangers players
Tigres de Aragua players
Tucson Toros players
Tulsa Drillers players